Du temps pour toi is francophone Canadian pop singer Isabelle Boulay's third live album, released on October 14, 2005. It met a rather good success in Belgium (Wallonia) and France, where it reached the top twenty.

The album was also released as a DVD, launched about one month after the CD edition. It contains two duets with Johnny Hallyday and Julien Clerc, and also a medley.

Track listing

 "Intro" — 2:06
 "Jamais" — 4:33
 "Parle-moi" — 3:43
 "Tout au bout de nos peines" Duet with Johnny Hallyday  — 3:31
 "Aimons-nous" — 3:43
 "Je voudrais" — 2:34
 "Du Temps pour toi" — 4:42
 "Medley acoustique" ("Quelques pleurs", "Jamais assez loin", "Je t'oublierai, je t'oublierai") — 5:46
 "La Vie devant toi" — 4:57
 "En t'attendant" — 3:55
 "Le Cœur volcan" — 3:22
 "Mieux qu'ici-bas" — 3:57
 "Les Séparés" Duet with Julien Clerc — 3:54
 "Le Cœur combat" — 3:55
 "Je sais ton nom" — 5:39
 "Un Jour ou l'autre" — 4:02
 "Une Autre Vie" — 8:44
 "Le Petit Garçon" — 4:26

Certifications

Charts

References

Isabelle Boulay albums
2005 live albums